Linked fate is a concept in political science which describes the mechanism by which group consciousness leads to political cohesion among members of a social identity group. It originated in African-American studies, as individuals who perceived their fates as individuals to be highly linked to those of other in-group members were posited to be more conscious of the group's interests as whole when making political decisions (such as voting). Furthermore, notions of linked fate have been observed among Asian Americans, Hispanic Americans and Muslim Americans.

See also 

Ethnic competition thesis
Group consciousness (political science)
Relative deprivation thesis
 Solidarity

References 

Political science